Manase Mandiram is a 1966 Indian Telugu-language romantic drama film, produced by Yarra Appa Rao and directed by C. V. Sridhar. It stars Akkineni Nageswara Rao and Savitri, with music composed by M. S. Viswanathan. The film was a remake of Sridhar's own Tamil film Nenjil Or Aalayam (1962).

Plot 
Dr. Raghu (Akkineni Nageswara Rao) dedicated his life for his medical profession and runs a cancer hospital. Once Seeta (Savitri) his ex-lover, who was forcibly married to a wise person Ramu (Jaggayya) arrives at his hospital and her husband is diagnosed with cancer and terminally ill. Raghu & Seeta are very much uncomfortable to interact in front of Ramu. Seeta suspects that Raghu will not be able to give proper treatment to Ramu because of his love interest in her. At that point in time, Raghu ensures Radha that he will definitely make Ramu recover. Parallelly, Ramu overhears the conversation, later takes a promise from Seeta that she should marry Raghu after his death. Now Ramu is to undergo major surgery under Raghu which will decide his fate. Here Raghu is seized with a feeling that he can't afford to fail in the surgery as it might seem that he was biased due to Seeta. So, he toils a lot for the preparation without proper food & sleep. At last, the surgery successfully takes place but unfortunately, Raghu dies out to hypertension. Finally, the movie ends Ramu & Seeta constructing a memorial hospital in the name of Raghu.

Cast 
Akkineni Nageswara Rao as Dr. Raghu
Savitri as Seeta
Jaggayya as Ramu
Gummadi as Father
Relangi as Devaiah
Nagabhushanam as Kantham's husband
Chalam as Jogulu
Santha Kumari as Raghu's mother
Girija as Kasulu
Sharada as Kantham
Jhansi as Nurse
Nirmalamma as Uma's mother
Baby Shantikala as Uma

Soundtrack 

Music composed by M. S. Viswanathan.

References

External links 
 

1966 romantic drama films
1960s Telugu-language films
Films directed by C. V. Sridhar
Films scored by M. S. Viswanathan
Films with screenplays by C. V. Sridhar
Films set in hospitals
Indian films about cancer
Indian romantic drama films
Telugu remakes of Tamil films